Oldham Mumps is a tram stop on the Oldham and Rochdale Line (ORL) of Greater Manchester's light-rail Metrolink system in the Mumps area of Oldham which opened in 2014.

A temporary stop of the same name opened to passengers on 13 June 2012 as part of Phase 3a of the system's expansion. Phase 3b resulted in the stop's decommissioning in 2014, and its replacement with the permanent stop at the opposite end of Mumps on a realigned track. The temporary stop was on the site of the original Oldham Mumps railway station, a heavy rail station which opened (initially for haulage) on 1 November 1847 and closed on 3 October 2009 for conversion to Metrolink. It was along the Oldham Loop Line, which operated from Manchester to Rochdale via Oldham and thus was almost identical to the current Metrolink route.

History

Mainline rail station

Oldham Mumps railway station opened on 1 November 1847 to serve the town of Oldham.

The name of the station is taken from its situation within the Mumps area of Oldham, which itself probably derived from the archaic word "mumper", slang for a beggar.

The station was reached across the dual-carriageway Oldham bypass, a difficult walk from the town centre. A pedestrian underpass led to the island platform, where there was a ticket office.

The station closed due to the conversion of the line to Metrolink on 3 October 2009 and, by May 2010, had been completely demolished. The station canopy has been saved. It was bought by the East Lancashire Railway after a successful public fund-raising campaign.

Temporary tram stop
In June 2010, the Greater Manchester Passenger Transport Executive (GMPTE) announced that as part of the conversion of the former Oldham loop, it would submit a planning application for a temporary Metrolink terminus at Oldham Mumps, close to the site of the former railway station. Services to the temporary terminus commenced on Wednesday 13 June 2012

The temporary Metrolink stop was reached by crossing Oldham Way or could be accessed by the free Metroshuttle service, which linked the station with the town centre and bus station.

The 'temporary' Oldham Mumps Metrolink Station closed on 18 January 2014.

Permanent tram stop
The permanent Metrolink station opened on 27 January 2014 on the site of the former B&Q store and is also a bus interchange.

Service pattern 

References

Bibliography

External links

Metrolink stop information
Oldham Mumps area map

History of the Metropolitan Borough of Oldham
Tram stops in the Metropolitan Borough of Oldham
Former Lancashire and Yorkshire Railway stations
Railway stations in Great Britain opened in 1847
Railway stations in Great Britain closed in 2009
Railway stations in Great Britain opened in 2012
Tram stops on the East Didsbury to Rochdale line
1847 establishments in England